Gonioctena is a genus of leaf beetles belonging to the family Chrysomelidae, subfamily Chrysomelinae.

Species

 Gonioctena americana Schaeffer, 1924 i c g b (American aspen beetle)
 Gonioctena arctica Mannerheim, 1853 g
 Gonioctena arunensis Cho & Borowiec g
 Gonioctena davidi g
 Gonioctena decemnotata (Marsham, 1802) g
 Gonioctena fornicata (Brüggemann, 1873) g
 Gonioctena fujiana Cho & Borowiec g
 Gonioctena gracilicornis Kraatz, 1879 g
 Gonioctena intermedia (Helliesen, 1913) g
 Gonioctena issikii (Chujo, 1958) g
 Gonioctena iyonis g
 Gonioctena kamikawai (Chujo, 1958) g
 Gonioctena kangdingensis g
 Gonioctena koryeoensis g
 Gonioctena lineata (Gené, 1839) g
 Gonioctena linnaeana (Schrank, 1781) g
 Gonioctena mauroi Cho & Borowiec g
 Gonioctena mausonensis Cho & Borowiec g
 Gonioctena medvedevi Cho & Borowiec g
 Gonioctena metallica Cho & Borowiec g
 Gonioctena mongolica Cho & Borowiec g
 Gonioctena nivosa Suffrian, 1851 i c g b
 Gonioctena norvegica (Strand, 1936) g
 Gonioctena notmani (Schaeffer, 1924) i c g b
 Gonioctena occidentalis (Brown, 1942) i c g
 Gonioctena ogloblini Medvedev & Dubeshko, 1972 g
 Gonioctena olivacea (Forster, 1771) g
 Gonioctena osawai Kimoto, 1996 g
 Gonioctena oudai Cho & Borowiec g
 Gonioctena pallida (Linnaeus, 1758) g
 Gonioctena quinquepunctata (Fabricius, 1787) g
 Gonioctena sapaensis Cho & Borowiec g
 Gonioctena sichuana Cho & Borowiec g
 Gonioctena springlovae Bechyne, 1948 g
 Gonioctena subgeminata Chen, 1941 g
 Gonioctena sundmani (Jacobson, 1901) g
 Gonioctena tonkinensis Chen, 1934 g
 Gonioctena tredecimmaculata (Jacoby, 1888) g
 Gonioctena variabilis (Olivier, 1790) g
 Gonioctena viminalis (Linnaeus, 1758) g

Data sources: i = ITIS, c = Catalogue of Life, g = GBIF, b = Bugguide.net

References

External links

 Biolib
 Chrysomelidae
 

Chrysomelinae
Beetles of Europe
Chrysomelidae genera
Taxa named by Louis Alexandre Auguste Chevrolat